Danielle Cristina Joia (born 22 May 1990) is a Brazilian handballer for Madeira Andebol SAD and the Brazilian national team.

Achievements

National team
Pan American Women's Club Handball Championship: 2017
World Women's Handball Championship:
18th: 2017
South American Games :
Winner: 2018

Domestic competitions
1ª Divisão de Andebol Feminino:
2nd Place: 2021/2022
Polish Superleague:
5th Place: 2019/2020
División de Honor Femenina de Balonmano:
4th Place: 2018/2019
Paulista Handball Championship:
Winner: 2018
2nd Place: 2017
Pan American Women's Club Handball Championship:
Winner: 2017
Brazil National League:
Winner: 2016
3rd Place: 2017

Individual awards
Best Young Athlete 2018
Best Centre of the Brfazilian Championship 2018

References

1990 births
Living people
Brazilian female handball players
South American Games gold medalists for Brazil
South American Games medalists in handball
Competitors at the 2018 South American Games
20th-century Brazilian women
21st-century Brazilian women